Luc Thimmesch (born 20 September 1980) is a retired Luxembourgian footballer who played as a midfielder for several clubs in Luxembourg's domestic National Division.

External links

1980 births
Living people
Luxembourgian footballers
Luxembourg international footballers
Association football midfielders